Zăbriceni is a commune in Edineț District, Moldova. It is composed of two villages, Onești and Zăbriceni.

References

Communes of Edineț District